The National Assembly Complex is the legislative building of the National Assembly, the legislative body for Federal Republic of Nigeria.
It was built in 1999 at a cost of nearly $35.18 million and the contract was awarded to ITB Nigeria, on February 18, 1996, through the Department of public building, FCDA, Abuja.

Description
The Complex was located in the Three Arms Zones of the Federal Capital territory, Abuja. The Complex's roof shape is a dome and comprises a gross floor area of 40,000 m2 to house both the Legislative Chamber and the Senatorial Chamber of the National Assembly.The structural element consists of pre-cast elements and in situ concrete.
Electrical and mechanical installation include Central air-conditioning system, CCTV, access control system, fire detection and fire fighting system.

References

National Assembly (Nigeria)
Nigeria